Developed at UC Berkeley, "Opinion Space" (also known as The Collective Discovery Engine) is a social media technology designed to help communities generate and exchange ideas about important issues and policies.  Version 1.0 was launched on April 4, 2009 at UC Berkeley, and explored the question "Do you think legalizing marijuana is a good idea?"  It has since undergone 4 different iterations, and been used in partnership with various organizations including The Occupy movement (Version 4.0, 5/24/2013) and the African Robots Network (Version 4.0, 5/25/2013). Opinion Space has also been used in collaboration with the United States State Department and the University of California's Berkeley Center for New Media (Version 2.0, 12/1/2009 and  Version 3.0, 2/25/2012) to gain public perspective on foreign policy issues.  Then U.S. Secretary of State Hillary Rodham Clinton explained, "Opinion Space will harness the power of connection technologies to provide a unique forum for international dialogue. This is...an opportunity to extend our engagement beyond the halls of government directly to the people of the world" (2010).

The website uses data visualization and  statistical analysis to present and develop public opinion and ideas.  Opinion Space is a self-organizing system that uses an intuitive graphical "map" that displays patterns, trends, and insights as they emerge and employs the wisdom of crowds to identify and highlight the most insightful ideas. The system uses a game model that incorporates techniques from deliberative polling, collaborative filtering, and multidimensional visualization.

See also
 Foreign policy of the United States
 Emergent democracy
 Deliberative opinion poll
 Online consultation
 Recommender system

Scholarly work

References

External links
 Opinion Space
 Research project page at EECS, UC Berkeley
 general information about the project from UC Berkeley

Opinion polling in the United States
Social media